Brevundimonas faecalis is a bacterium from the genus of Brevundimonas.

References

External links
Type strain of Brevundimonas faecalis at BacDive -  the Bacterial Diversity Metadatabase

Bacteria described in 2012
Caulobacterales